Pál Király (1880–1965) was a Hungarian engineer and weapons designer.

Work & designs
He is best known for development of lever-delayed blowback firearms, and being employed by the Danuvia company in the 1930s and 1940s to design and produce weapons for the Royal Hungarian Army. He designed the Danuvia 39M and improved it into the Danuvia 43M submachine gun. After he moved to the Dominican republic, he designed the .30 Kiraly-Cristobal carbine, which was essentially a copy of his earlier work, specifically the 44M (an improved 43M). He made two more Cristobal carbine versions, the delayed blowback M2 in .30 Carbine and the gas-operated M3 in 7.62×51mm NATO. He patented the latter in 1961 as a competitor to the Belgian FN FAL.

Personal life
He moved to the Dominican Republic as an expatriate in 1948.

References

 MANOWAR'S AUSTRO-HUNGARIAN WEAPONS - DESIGNERS' & BUILDERS' BIOGRAPHIES.

1880 births
1965 deaths
Austro-Hungarian military personnel of World War I
Firearm designers
Engineers from Budapest
20th-century Hungarian inventors
Weapon designers from Hungary